Lloyd Park tram stop is on the edge of Lloyd Park in the London Borough of Croydon in the southern suburbs of London, beside Coombe Road and opposite Croham Park Avenue and Castlemaine Avenue. It is 200 metres east of the site of the Coombe Road railway station, on the former Woodside and South Croydon Railway.

Services
Lloyd Park is served by tram services operated by Tramlink. The tram stop is served by trams every 7-8 minutes between New Addington and  via  and Centrale.

During the evenings on weekends, the service is reduced to a tram every 15 minutes.

Services are operated using Bombardier CR4000 and Stadler Variobahn Trams.

References

External links

Lloyd Park tram stop – Live departures and timetables at Transport for London

Tramlink stops in the London Borough of Croydon
Railway stations in Great Britain opened in 2000